The 2004-05 Everton F.C. season was Everton's 13th season in the FA Premier League, and their 51st consecutive season in the top division of English football.

Season summary
Many pundits had tipped Everton for relegation that season: having escaped relegation from the Premier League by six points the previous season, Everton's task to stay in English football's top flight only seemed harder after the multimillion-pound transfer of teenage striker Wayne Rooney to Manchester United after setting the summer's European Championships alight. However, the season turned out to be Everton's most successful in Premier League history as they placed fourth in the league with 61pts. Everton kept pace with the likes of Chelsea (95pts) and Arsenal (83pts) at the Premier League summit for the first half of the season, finishing 2004 only a few points adrift of leaders Chelsea. Although Everton's title challenge eventually fizzled out following the sale of out-of-contract midfielder Thomas Gravesen to Spanish giants Real Madrid, they were able to see off competition from arch-rivals Liverpool (58pts) and fellow northwesterners Bolton Wanderers (58pts) to finish in fourth place, three points ahead of both teams. This secured the Toffees qualification to the 2005–06 Champions League, in which they would enter the tournament in the third qualifying round. In the summer, manager David Moyes splashed the cash on the likes of Netherlands and Inter Milan winger Andy van der Meyde in a bid to keep Everton in a position to make a serious challenge for European qualification the following season.

Despite their high league finish, Everton had the unwanted distinction of finishing with a negative goal difference, as a result of an embarrassing 7–0 humbling at Arsenal in the penultimate game of the season.

Final league table

Players

First-team squad
Squad at end of season

Left club during season

Reserve squad

Transfers

In
  Marcus Bent -  Ipswich Town, £450,000, 23 June
  Tim Cahill -  Millwall, undisclosed (estimated £2,000,000), 23 July
  Eddy Bosnar -  Sturm Graz, free, 4 August
  James Beattie -  Southampton, £6,000,000, 4 January
  Mikel Arteta -  Real Sociedad, five-month loan, 1 February
  Bjarni Viðarsson -  FH, undisclosed

Out
  Joey Jones -  Macclesfield Town, free, 18 May
  Niclas Alexandersson - Gothenburg, free, 1 July
  Paul Gerrard -  Nottingham Forest, free, 2 July
  Steve Simonsen -  Stoke City, free, 8 July
  David Unsworth -  Portsmouth, free, 12 July
  Tomasz Radzinski -  Fulham, undisclosed, 23 July
  Tobias Linderoth -  Copenhagen, undisclosed, 30 July
  Steven Schumacher -  Bradford City, free, 30 July
  Michael Symes -  Bradford City, free, 30 July
  Scot Gemmill -  Leicester City, free, 5 August
  Wayne Rooney -  Manchester United, £20,000,000 (rising to £27,000,000 depending on appearances and achievements), 31 August
  Kevin Campbell -  West Bromwich Albion, free, 10 January
  Thomas Gravesen -  Real Madrid, £2,500,000, 14 January
  Nick Chadwick -  Plymouth Argyle, £250,000, 8 February
  Peter Clarke -  Blackpool

Results

Premier League

Results by round

Matches

FA Cup
 Plymouth Argyle 1–3 Everton (attendance 20,112)
 Everton 3–0 Sunderland (attendance 33,186)
 Everton 0–2 Manchester United (attendance 38,664)

League Cup
 22 September 2004: Bristol City 2–2 Everton (3–4 pen.)
 27 October 2004: Everton 2–0 Preston North End

Statistics

Appearances and goals

|-
! colspan=14 style=background:#dcdcdc; text-align:center| Goalkeepers

|-
! colspan=14 style=background:#dcdcdc; text-align:center| Defenders

|-
! colspan=14 style=background:#dcdcdc; text-align:center| Midfielders

|-
! colspan=14 style=background:#dcdcdc; text-align:center| Forwards

|-
! colspan=14 style=background:#dcdcdc; text-align:center| Players transferred out during the season

References

2004-05
Everton